| tries               = {{#expr: 
+7 +8 +5 +11 +8 +6 +8 +5 +8 +6 +5 +6 +5 +8 +3 
+1 +7 +9 +7 +2 +10 +1 +3 +9 +6 +8 +4 +4 +8 +7 
+6 +7 +6 +5 +6 +7 +1 +6 +5 +6 +4 +6 +3 +6 +3 
+5 +6 +6 +6 +5 +3 +4 +6 +6 +6 +5 +4 +10 +5 +4 
+1 +8 +10 +7 +8 +9 +2 
}}
| top point scorer    = (128 points)
| top try scorer      = (11 tries)
| venue               = Memorial Stadium, Bristol
| attendance2         = 4,375
| champions           =  Bristol
| count               = 1
| runner-up           =  Bedford Blues
| website             = 
| previous year       = 2009–10
| previous tournament = 2009–10 British and Irish Cup
| next year           = 2011–12
| next tournament     = 2011–12 British and Irish Cup
}}

The 2010–11 British and Irish Cup was the 2nd season of the annual rugby union competition for second tier, semi-professional clubs from Britain and Ireland.  First round matches began on Friday 15 October 2010 and the final was held on Saturday 7 May 2011.

Defending champions Cornish Pirates were unable to make it out of the pool stages.  Bristol lifted the cup, narrowly defeating Bedford Blues 17-14 in the first all-English final.

Teams
The allocation of teams was as follows:

 – 12 teams from RFU Championship
 – 3 Irish provinces represented by 'A' teams.
 – 3 Scottish sides, top clubs from the Scottish Premiership.
 – 6 top clubs from the Principality Premiership.

Competition format 
The teams were divided into four pools of six, playing over five weekends during the Autumn International and Six Nations windows.  The four pool winners and runners-up contested a knock-out stage, with quarter-finals on 5 or 6 March, semi-finals on 23 March and the final on 7 May.

Pool stages

Pool A

Pool B

Pool C

Pool D 

This fixture would double up as a cup and 2010–11 RFU Championship game after the cup game was initially postponed.

Knock-out stages

Qualifiers 
The four pool winners and the four runners up proceeded to the knock out stages.  The best four qualifiers (pool winners) had home advantage in the quarter finals.

Quarter-finals

Semi-finals

Final

Top scorers

Top points scorers

Top try scorers

Geography

References

External links 
  Unofficial British and Irish Cup website - latest news, teams etc
  Results from the BBC 

British and Irish Cup
2010–11 rugby union tournaments for clubs
2010–11 RFU Championship
2010–11 in Irish rugby union
2010–11 in Welsh rugby union
2010–11 in Scottish rugby union
2010–11 in British rugby union